The Tzeachten First Nation is a band government of the Sto:lo people located in the Upper Fraser Valley region near Chilliwack, British Columbia, Canada.  They are a member government of the Sto:lo Nation tribal council.

The traditional language of the Tzeachten is Halq’eméylem.

References

Sto:lo governments
First Nations governments in the Lower Mainland